The Boy I Used to Be is the first extended play (EP) by Bombay Bicycle Club, released in 2007. It was released on CD and 1,000 limited edition numbered 10-inch vinyl. 500 vinyl copies were also pressed by the independent record label Nettwerk. It was the band's first release since winning Channel 4's "Road to V" competition, where they won the opportunity to be the opening act at the 2006 V Festival.

Recording
The EP was recorded at Chapel Studios in Lincolnshire with the music producer Jim Abbiss, who had previously worked with Arctic Monkeys and Kasabian. It contained tracks that were re-recordings of demos that the band had performed in their bedrooms.

Release
The band self-released the EP on their own label, Mmm... Records, despite receiving numerous record label offers following the "Road to V" competition. In an interview with The Independent, the band stated that this was because they wanted to gain more experience in the industry first.

Track listing

References

External links
Bombay Bicycle Club official website

2007 debut EPs
Bombay Bicycle Club albums